Peter Adam (3 August 1929 – 28 September 2019) was a British filmmaker and author. Born in Berlin, Germany, his work included Eileen Gray: Her Life and Work: The Biography (2009), Outlines: David Hockney (1997), and Art of the Third Reich.

Early life
Adam was born in 1929 in Berlin, Germany, the son of Luise (Gurke) and Walter Adam. His family was middle-class. His father was Jewish and his mother Protestant. In 1944, he moved to Austria. He became a British citizen in 1965 before taking up a career in broadcasting.

Career
Adam was an executive producer with the BBC for 22 years. He was the editor of the arts magazines Review and Arena. He was made an Officier des Arts et des Lettres by the French Government. An autobiography, Mémoires à contre-vent, was published in French by Edition La Différence in April 2010, previously issued in English as Not Drowning But Waving. An Autobiography (Andre Deutsch, London 1995). His memoirs detailed his friendships with many prominent filmmakers and writers. Adam was a close friend of the painters Prunella Clough and Keith Vaughan, and contributed much to work on both artists.
He was the author of the biography of the architect and designer Eileen Gray, published in England, USA, Germany, France, Japan and Russia. He also wrote a book on David Hockney titled David Hockney and his Friends.
His other books included Kertesz by Kertesz and Eisenstaedt by Eisenstaedt.
Adam lived between London and France where he had a house at La Garde Freinet. His London house had been bought from painter Prunella Cough. In his final years he left Britain to live between Paris and the south of France, where he married his life partner, the actor Facundo Bo.

Film works
He made over 100 documentaries for BBC Current Affairs and for the Music and Arts Department, among them many prize-winning films:

Lawrence Durrell's Spirit of Place: nominated for a British Academy Award for Best Factual Programme of 1976
Richard Strauss Remembered: Golden Award Houston Film Festival for Best Full Length Documentary of 1985
Lotte Lenya and Kurt Weill: Prix Italia selection
George Gershwin Remembered: British Academy Nomination for Best Arts Program, 1987; Prime Time Emmy Nomination for Outstanding Special, 1988
Art of the Third Reich: Winner of the 1989 British Academy Award in 1989 for Best Arts Documentary of the Year
Nominated for the British Film Institute Award
Nominated for an Ace Award in Los Angeles
He made films on Hockney, Luchino Visconti, Edward Albee, Lillian Hellman, Hans Werner Henze, Serge Diaghilev and the Ballets Russes, the German Cinema, and a ten-part series on Modern Architecture.
He staged Stravinsky's The Soldier's Tale and Kurt Weill's The Little Mahagonny and Happy End.

References

1929 births
2019 deaths
University of Paris alumni
Officiers of the Ordre des Arts et des Lettres
British people of German-Jewish descent
German emigrants to Austria
Austrian emigrants to the United Kingdom
British expatriates in France